The Proton Lekiu is a series of concept SUV produced by the Malaysian automobile manufacturer, Proton. It was first displayed at the 2010 Kuala Lumpur International Motor Show (KLIMS 2010).

Etymology
The name "Lekiu" refers to a legendary warrior from Malacca called Hang Lekiu. The car is a member of the Pahlawan series of Proton's concept cars, which are named after warriors.

Specifications

It was based on the Proton Exora MPV, but with some cosmetic modifications on it. This includes a slightly revamped front grill, front and rear bumpers, head and tail lights, and a completely redesigned tailgate. Fresh to the car was the newly-designed alloy wheels, which featured 14 spokes. It shared the same platform as the Exora, but the suspension was raised to give the Lekiu a more offroading-oriented outlook.

See also
Proton Exora
Proton Jebat
Proton EMAS

References

External links

Proton Holdings Berhad

Lekiu
2010s cars
Cars introduced in 2010
Cars powered by transverse 4-cylinder engines